Lucas Hernán Ceballos (born 22 December 1998) is an Argentine footballer who plays as a defender for AATEDYC.

Career
Ceballos started out with Comunicaciones of Primera C, making eight appearances. In 2009, he left to join Torneo Argentino C club Boca Río Gallegos. One goal in sixteen games followed in Torneo Argentino C as Boca won promotion into the 2009–10 Torneo Argentino B. 2010 saw Ceballos sign for Defensores Unidos, he remained there for three seasons and made over one hundred appearances. A short spell with Primera B Metropolitana side Acassuso, with whom he scored on his professional debut with versus Defensores de Belgrano in August 2013, followed prior to a return to Defensores Unidos in 2014.

In 2020, Ceballos joined Torneo Regional Federal Amateur team AATEDYC.

References

External links

1988 births
Living people
Footballers from Buenos Aires
Argentine footballers
Association football midfielders
Primera C Metropolitana players
Torneo Argentino C players
Torneo Argentino B players
Primera B Metropolitana players
Club Comunicaciones footballers
Boca Río Gallegos footballers
Defensores Unidos footballers
Club Atlético Acassuso footballers